La fuerza del amor (English title: The power of love) is a Mexican telenovela produced by Gonzalo Martínez Ortega for Televisa in 1990.

Alfredo Adame and Gabriela Hassel starred as the protagonists, while Ernesto Gómez Cruz starred as the main antagonist.

Plot 
Felipe, Marcos and Carlos are three young and enthusiastic medical students, arriving in a village lost in Pachuca with intentions to practice there. But upon arrival, they find an emphatic rejection by the people, since everyone blindly relies on Don Torino, the healer of the place, who in reality has taken advantage of the trust of the people to manipulate them at will.

Cast 

 Alfredo Adame as Felipe
 Gabriela Hassel as Fabiola
 Ernesto Gómez Cruz as Don Torino
 Eduardo Palomo as Gilberto
 Karen Sentíes as María Inés
 Ari Telch as Marcos
 Odiseo Bichir as Carlos
 Juan Ignacio Aranda as Rodolfo
 Dolores Beristáin as Evelyn
 Óscar Bonfiglio as Héctor
 Josefina Echánove  as Ana Bertha
 Katia del Río as Sheila
 Rocío Sobrado as Luz María
 Cecilia Tijerina as Haydeé
 Arturo García Tenorio as Ramón
 Maripaz García as Maritza
 Guillermo Gil as Don Gregorio
 Miguel Gómez Checa as Vicente
 Aarón Hernán as Rómulo
 Jaime Lozano  as Dionisio
 Jorge Russek as Gustavo
 Luisa Huertas as Mercedes
 Edith Kleiman as Delfina
 Salvador Sánchez as Father Victoria
 Rafael Montalvo as Tomás
 Oscar Morelli as Damián
 Martha Navarro as Gertrudis
 Evangelina Martínez as Juana
 Mercedes Pascual as Dolores
 Rodrigo Puebla as Tacho
 Bruno Rey as Sabas
 Rubén Rojo as Mark
 Lizzeta Romo as Ángela
 Teresa Rábago as Josefina
 Alfredo Sevilla as Don Heliodoro
 Lilia Sixtos as Rosa
 Silvia Suárez as Luisa
 Evangelina Sosa as Chencha
 Blanca Sánchez as Irene

Awards

References

External links 
 

1990 telenovelas
Mexican telenovelas
1990 Mexican television series debuts
1991 Mexican television series endings
Spanish-language telenovelas
Television shows set in Mexico
Televisa telenovelas